Ángel Gabriel Tejada Escobar (born 1 June 1991) is a Honduran professional footballer who plays as a forward for Costa Rican club Alajuelense.

References

External links

1991 births
Living people
Honduran footballers
Honduran expatriate footballers
Honduras international footballers
Atlético Choloma players
C.D. Honduras Progreso players
Real C.D. España players
C.D.S. Vida players
F.C. Motagua players
Municipal Pérez Zeledón footballers
Liga FPD players
Association football forwards
2017 CONCACAF Gold Cup players
Honduran expatriate sportspeople in Costa Rica
Expatriate footballers in Costa Rica